Wuhan Sports University, formerly translated as Wuhan Institute of Physical Education, (WIPE), is a tertiary educational institution in China. According to the statistics released by the Ministry of Education of China, the university is one of the four leading universities in the physical education area in China. The university has many world-famous alumni, such as gymnast Cheng Fei, who won more than 19 gold medals including an Olympic one. And this can be better illustrated during Beijing 2008 Olympic Games, when WIPE alumni alone won 6 gold medals, 2 silver medals and 3 bronze medals.

Wuhan Sports University is located in Hubei Province's capital Wuhan, known as "the thoroughfare leading to nine provinces". It has two campuses which are Majiazhuang Campus() and Canglong Campus.

History 
Wuhan Sports University's origins can be traced back to Zhongnan Institute of Physical Education, in Nanchang City, Jiangxi province. The Zhongnan Institute was formed in 1953. Shortly after, in 1955, the institute moved to its present site in Wuhan, Hubei Province, and changed its name to the Wuhan Institute of Physical Education (WIPE) in February 1956. WIPE was formerly administered by the National General Administration of Sports and, now it turned to be  under the administration of both the National General Administration of Sports and the Hubei Provincial Government in the year 2001. In the year 1985, WIPE started its first art major; Sport Management. Since then several other art majors emerged, such as sport psychology, sport English and so forth, till the newest Sport Advertising. And this is a quintessence of ongoing reform of Tertiary educational institutions in China, whose aim is to combine USSR-style specific school into comprehensive institution.

Academics 
WIPE now has 8 colleges, 2 faculties, 3 departments and 2 schools, 15 educational and teaching units in total. The names of these units are listed as follow:

 Physical Education College
 Sports Training College
 Chinese Martial Arts College
 Gymnastics College
 Sports Economy & Management College
 Health Science College or College of Health Science
 Competitive Sports School
 Adult Education School
 Sports Information & Technology Faculty
 Sports Journalism & Foreign Language Faculty
 the Postgraduate Department
 Political Theory Department
 Training Department

Since 2006, WIPE launched its 3+1 cooperative education project with University of the West of England. Students enrolled as its "3+1" project participants will study at Wuhan for the first 3 years and then go to UWE for the last year of study. In autumn semester of 2009, the first 15 students participated in the 3+1 project in 2006 were sent to UWE. WIPE was largely aimed for education of undergraduate level, and its graduate school, though famous in a time during the 1980s, was increasingly eclipsed by Beijing Sports University. However, in 2006, WIPE was authorized for the conferment of doctor's degree; and in August 2010, Ministry of Education listed WIPE as one of universities whose students can enrol directly in graduate school without taking exams.

School Assets 

In the year 2009, the fixed assets of WIPE were about 760 million yuan. Throughout the Majiazhuang Campus, there are 12 dormitory buildings, and is constructing the 13th one.

Natatorium 

WIPE's indoor swimming pool, constructed in 1984 and put into service since 1986, is a combination of public and competition pool. The pool is maintained in constant temperature. It was then the largest swimming pool in China equipped with solar heating system, which were able to heat 70 tons of hot water daily according to its original design. Affiliated to and overseen by teaching and researching section of swimming in WIPE, the Swimming pool have been run by a private contractor., especially in summer. Athletes here have competed in different level of swimming event as well as less publicized fin swimming competition, having attained phenomenal accomplishments such as 10 world champions. There were 6 world records, 4 Asian records and 5 national records kept here.

Recently criticisms arose in  the local media concerning the health regulation in swimming pool, including WIPE's natatorium. Critics said local swimming pools lacked proper sanitation of water, and inadequately checked Health Certificate of visitors as was required by law. One of the employees here contended that
“财力有限，若配备专业医生，费用难承担；并且，根据业内“潜规则”：游泳是不需要《健康证》的。”
Roughly Translated as: With limited wherewithal, a doctor can't be afforded; moreover, according to intra-industry hidden rules, there is no need of Health Certificate beforehand to swim.

Present 

Wuhan Sports University has a total staff of 812, of which over 500 are professional teachers and trainers. This includes over 60 are professors, researchers and national trainers; 165 are associate professors; 3 posts are for Chutian Scholar visiting professors; 10 are Hubei Outstanding Contributions Experts; 10 experts get the subsidy of the State Council and provincial government. In the teachers, 13.8% have doctor degree, 49.8% have master or higher degree. On October 2009, Prof.Walter Brehm, the dean of the Sport Institute of University of Bayreuth of Germany, was provided a visiting professor tenure.

At Wuhan Sports University, there are all kinds of indoors and outdoors sports buildings, classrooms buildings, and
advanced research facilities. Furthermore, books in the library are up to more than 800,000 volumes.

References

External links 
 
Official website 

Universities and colleges in Wuhan
Sports universities and colleges in China